Metacrateria perirrorella is a species of snout moth. It was described by George Hampson in 1918 and is found in South Africa.

References

Endemic moths of South Africa
Moths described in 1918
Phycitinae